Dimorphanthera is a genus of flowering plants belonging to the family Ericaceae.

Its native range is Central Malesia to Papuasia.

Species:

Dimorphanthera alba 
Dimorphanthera albida 
Dimorphanthera albiflora 
Dimorphanthera alpina 
Dimorphanthera alpivaga 
Dimorphanthera amblyornidis 
Dimorphanthera amoena 
Dimorphanthera amplifolia 
Dimorphanthera anchorifera 
Dimorphanthera angiliensis 
Dimorphanthera anomala 
Dimorphanthera antennifera 
Dimorphanthera apoana 
Dimorphanthera beccariana 
Dimorphanthera brachyantha 
Dimorphanthera bracteata 
Dimorphanthera brevipes 
Dimorphanthera calodon 
Dimorphanthera collinsii 
Dimorphanthera continua 
Dimorphanthera cornuta 
Dimorphanthera crassifolia 
Dimorphanthera cratericola 
Dimorphanthera dekockii 
Dimorphanthera denticulifera 
Dimorphanthera doctersii 
Dimorphanthera dryophila 
Dimorphanthera elegantissima 
Dimorphanthera eymae 
Dimorphanthera fissiflora 
Dimorphanthera forbesii 
Dimorphanthera glauca 
Dimorphanthera hirsutiflora 
Dimorphanthera ingens 
Dimorphanthera inopinata 
Dimorphanthera intermedia 
Dimorphanthera kalkmanii 
Dimorphanthera kempteriana 
Dimorphanthera keysseri 
Dimorphanthera lancifolia 
Dimorphanthera latifolia 
Dimorphanthera leucostoma 
Dimorphanthera longifolia 
Dimorphanthera longistyla 
Dimorphanthera macbainii 
Dimorphanthera macleaniifolia 
Dimorphanthera magnifica 
Dimorphanthera megacalyx 
Dimorphanthera meliphagidum 
Dimorphanthera microphylla 
Dimorphanthera miliraris 
Dimorphanthera myzomelae 
Dimorphanthera napuensis 
Dimorphanthera nigropunctata 
Dimorphanthera obtusifolia 
Dimorphanthera ovatifolia 
Dimorphanthera papillata 
Dimorphanthera parviflora 
Dimorphanthera parvifolia 
Dimorphanthera peekelii 
Dimorphanthera prainiana 
Dimorphanthera pulchra 
Dimorphanthera racemosa 
Dimorphanthera robbinsii 
Dimorphanthera seramica 
Dimorphanthera tedentii 
Dimorphanthera thibaudifolia 
Dimorphanthera torricellensis 
Dimorphanthera umbellata 
Dimorphanthera vaccinioides 
Dimorphanthera velutina 
Dimorphanthera vestita 
Dimorphanthera viridiflora 
Dimorphanthera vonroemeri 
Dimorphanthera wickendeniana 
Dimorphanthera wisselensis 
Dimorphanthera wollastonii 
Dimorphanthera womersleyi 
Dimorphanthera wrightiana

References

Ericaceae
Ericaceae genera